Effie Anderson Smith (September 29, 1869 – April 21, 1955), also known as Mrs. A.Y. Smith, was an early Arizona impressionist painter of desert landscapes, many of Cochise County and the Grand Canyon.

Biography
Smith was born in the rural countryside near Nashville, Arkansas, in 1869.  She grew up in Arkansas and served as a school teacher in Hope, Arkansas until 1893, when she left Arkansas for New Mexico, and then Arizona. She studied with California Impressionists in Oakland (1904), with May Bradford Shockley in San Francisco (1908), in Laguna Beach with Anna Althea Hills (1914) and also at the Stickney Memorial Art School in Pasadena with Jean Mannheim and Richard E. Miller (1915-16). Her exhibitions include a show of her Southwest paintings in Corcoran Hall at George Washington University in Washington, DC beginning May 20, 1931. She lived for 56 years in southern Arizona, first in Benson (1895–96), then in Pearce (from 1896 to 1941) and later in Douglas (from 1941 to 1951) in Cochise County, and seasonally in Morenci in Greenlee County at the home of her son Lewis A. Smith.

Smith moved to Prescott, Arizona in 1951, and died there at the Arizona Pioneers' Home in 1955. She was buried at the Mountain View Cemetery in Prescott.

From January 11 to April 28, 2019, the Tucson Desert Art Museum presented a 150th birthday anniversary retrospective exhibit of E.A. Smith's landscapes with 46 of her canvases on display from her most prolific years (1926–1949), including four of her renowned Grand Canyon paintings.  The largest permanent public display of E.A. Smith's paintings are on exhibit at the Douglas Historical Society, Douglas, Arizona.

Gallery

References 

 "Encyclopedia of Arkansas History & Culture" www.encyclopediaofarkansas.net, Effie Anderson Smith (1869–1955)
 "Mrs. A.Y. Smith, Arizona Artist" by Marian Compton, Progressive Arizona and the Great Southwest, Vol. 9, No. 5 (November 1929)
 "Principal Women of America" (1932), Mitre Press, London.
 "Arizona’s Forgotten Artist Mrs. A.Y. Smith" by O. Carroll Arnold, Cochise County Historical Journal, Vol. 19, No. 3 (Fall 1989)
 "An Encyclopedia of Women Artists of the American West" by P.& M.Y. Kovinick (1998), University of Texas Press, Austin.
 "Artists in California, 1786–1940" by E.M. Hughes (2002), Crocker Art Museum, Sacramento.
 "The Artists Bluebook" by L.P. Dunbier (2005), AskART Publishing
 "Arizona's Pioneering Women Artists" by Betsy Fahlman & Lonnie Pierson Dunbar (2012), Museum of Northern Arizona.
 "The Arkansas Gazette", Little Rock Arkansas, 5 July 1892, 28 Feb 1893, 28 May 1893, 28 June 1893
 "Prescott Evening Courier", Prescott Arizona, Obituary of 22 April 1955
 www.AskART.com
 1870 United States Census, Arkansas, Sevier County, Washington Township

External links
 E.A. Smith Archive
 Effie Anderson Smith bio at Encyclopedia of Arkansas History and Culture
 E.A. Smith bio at Sharlot Hall Museum website
 Tucson Desert Art Museum
 Douglas Historical Society

1869 births
1955 deaths
American women painters
Painters from Arizona
People from Cochise County, Arizona
People from Howard County, Arkansas
19th-century American painters
20th-century American painters
19th-century American women artists
20th-century American women artists
Artists from Arkansas
American Impressionist painters
People from Prescott, Arizona